Maniknagar is a village located  away from Humnabad city in Bidar district in the Indian state of Karnataka. Maniknagar is a little village comprising a hamlet and a temple complex, the nucleus of which is the main temple of Manik Prabhu's Samadhi. Maniknagar is situated on the slopes of high ground near the holy confluence of two little rivulets Guru-Ganga and Viraja. The climate is by and large temperate.

See also
Shri Manik Prabhu Devasthanam

References

External links

Villages in Bidar district